Supermax was a project of Austrian musician and producer Kurt Hauenstein (1949–2011), best known for the 1979 hit "It Ain't Easy", and "Lovemachine", a 1977 German #4 single, that peaked at #6 in Switzerland, #9 in Austria and #96 in US.

The first members of the band were Kurt Hauenstein (Mini Moog, vocals), Hans Ochs (guitar), Ken Taylor (bass guitar), Lothar Krell (keyboards), Peter Koch (percussion), Jürgen Zöller (drums) and the singers Cee Cee Cobb and Jean Graham. After Ken Taylor left the band in 1979, Kurt Hauenstein returned to his origin music instrument, the bass guitar. Later, Bernadet Onore Eben and Jessica Hauenstein, the daughter of Kurt Hauenstein, joined the group as backing vocal singers. From 2006 Raimund Bretterbauer joined as his Sound Engineer and Co Producer.

In 1981, Supermax toured as the first mixed-race band through South Africa for 21 gigs. Despite warnings and death threats, Supermax finished the tour, but this made some countries refuse permits for entry, and consequently the group was black-listed by some political organizations.

In 1983, Supermax was invited to play as special guest from Europe at the Reggae Sunsplash Festival in Montego Bay, Jamaica.

Discography
 1976: Don't Stop the Music
 1977: Lovemachine
 1977: World of Today
 1979: Fly with Me
 1980: Types of Skin
 1981: Meets the Almighty
 1983: Electricity
 1986: Something in My Heart
 1988: Just Before the Nightmare
 1990: World of Tomorrow – Hansa
 1992: Tha Max Is Gonna Kick Ya
 1993: One and All
 1995: 3 Club-CDs: Spirits of Love, Living in a World, Magnetic Rhythm
 1997: Supermax – 20th Anniversary
 1998: "YAKU" Total Immigration
 2001: Terminal 2002
 2007: Remaxed Vol. 1
 2007: Remaxed Vol. 2
 2008: Supermax – Best Of
 2009: ЗЕМЛЯНЕ & SUPERMAX

References

External links

Official web site

Austrian pop rock music groups
Austrian reggae musical groups
Austrian funk musical groups
Musical groups established in 1976